The Avonside Engine Company was a locomotive manufacturer in Avon Street, St. Philip's, Bristol, England between 1864 and 1934. However the business originated with an earlier enterprise Henry Stothert and Company.

Origins
The firm was originally started by Henry Stothert in 1837 as Henry Stothert and Company. Henry was the son of George Stothert (senior), founder of the nearby Bath engineering firm of Stothert & Pitt. Henry's brother, also named George, was manager of the same firm.

The company was given an order for two broad gauge  Firefly class express passenger engines Arrow and Dart, with  driving wheels, delivered for the opening of the Great Western Railway (GWR) from Bristol to Bath on 31 August 1840. This was soon followed by an order for eight smaller  Sun class engines with  driving wheels.

Stothert, Slaughter and Company
Edward Slaughter joined the company in 1841, when it became known as Stothert, Slaughter and Company.  By 1844 their works were named "Avonside Ironworks". In 1846 built Avalanche the first of five six-coupled saddle tank banking engines for the GWR.  1846 also saw the delivery of six  tender locomotives for the opening of the Waterford and Limerick Railway in Ireland.  Another large order came for ten broad gauge passenger s with 7 ft 6 in drivers and eight goods engines from the Bristol and Exeter Railway for the independent operation of that line from 1 May 1849. In 1851 the company acquired a shipbuilding yard, of which Henry Stothert took charge as a separate undertaking.

Slaughter, Grüning and Company
In 1856 Henry Grüning became a partner of Edward Slaughter at the locomotive works, which then became Slaughter, Grüning and Company.

Avonside Engine Company Ltd
In 1864, the time-limited partnership came to an end and the company took advantage of the Companies Acts and became the Avonside Engine Company Ltd, with Edward Slaughter still as managing director. Henry Gruning continued his involvement by becoming a director. As if to mark the occasion, the works received a large order (the first from the GWR for some years following the development of Swindon Works) for twenty  Hawthorn class engines with 6 ft drivers.

The Avonside Engine Company and its predecessors were unusual in that most of the production before 1880 consisted of main line locomotives largely for British railway companies but also for export. However, by 1881 main line locomotives were getting much bigger and exceeding the capacity of the manufacturing equipment. They made a positive decision to concentrate on the smaller industrial railway locomotive types for within the capacity of the existing plant. This change was to a degree forced on the company as a result of financial difficulties following Edward Slaughter's death. Edwin Walker of the Bristol Engineering firm Fox, Walker & Co. joined Avonside and endeavoured to turn the company round, but without success.

In 1899 the company built for the short lived North Mount Lyell Railway three s designed by David Jones (railway).

Re-organisation
Walker was forced to liquidate the old company and form a new company with the same name to carry on the same business at the same address. At about this time the old firm of Fox, Walker & Co. was taken over by Thomas Peckett and became Peckett and Sons.

Move to Fishponds

In 1905 the Avonside firm left its historic home at St. Philips for a new plant at Fishponds but still with a small engine policy.

Closure

The company entered voluntary liquidation in 1934 and the goodwill and designs of the company were bought in 1935 by the Hunslet Engine Company.

Locomotive types
During the 1860s and 1870s the Avonside company built broad gauge and standard gauge engines for many British companies, large and small but they also built up a considerable export business. Unfortunately detailed company records from this period have not survived.

Fairlie

This lack of records is particularly unfortunate in that the company was the largest British builder of the Fairlie articulated locomotive. Amongst the first to be built at Bristol was James Spooner built in 1872 for the Ffestiniog Railway. Although built to the same basic design as the remarkably successful Little Wonder built by George England and Co. in 1869, it incorporated many detailed improvements and became the prototype for subsequent Ffestiniog Railway engines built in that company's works at Boston Lodge.

In 1872 on the recommendation of Sir Charles Fox and Sons, Avonside built two large 42-ton  Fairlies for shipment to Canada, one each to the Toronto, Grey and Bruce Railway and the Toronto and Nipissing Railway. The Avonside Works Manager at the time these locomotives were built was Alfred Sacré, the brother of Charles Sacré Locomotive Engineer of the Manchester Sheffield & Lincolnshire Railway. Alfred Sacré trained under Archibald Sturrock at the Doncaster Plant of the Great Northern Railway and in 1872 moved from Avonside to the Yorkshire Engine Company, Sheffield where he built more Fairlie types.

Avonside locomotives were exported also to Uruguay, where two 1874 Fairlie type locomotives (plate numbers: 1032/33, 1034/35) worked in the Ferrocarril y Tranvía del Norte, at Montevideo.

In 1874, New Zealand Railways ordered two types of Double Fairlie locomotives from Avonside. Both the B class and E class Double Fairlies were fitted with Walschaerts valve gear. This was certainly the first use of this technology to be used in New Zealand, and is possibly the first time a British manufacturer has supplied it. The B class lasted in service until the late 1880s. The E class were officially written off in 1899, however, most were still in use during the first world war.
 
An  single Fairlie was built for the Swindon, Marlborough and Andover Railway in 1878. To use a valve gear that fitted entirely outside the wheels, leaving the space between the frames clear for the boiler, this was the first British-based locomotive to use Walschaerts valve gear.

In 1878–1879 on the recommendation of Robert Francis Fairlie Avonside built the R class of 18  single Fairlies for the New Zealand Government Railways. One, a single fairlie R class number 28 (of 1878) survives at Reefton.

Avonside Fairlie Works list.
Avonside issued a double works plate for each double Fairlie, however it is believed that this policy was not always adhered to.

Fell
Earlier in 1875 the company had built four powerful tank engines designed by a Swedish Engineer H.W. Widmark to operate on the Fell mountain railway system on the Rimutaka Incline in the North Island of New Zealand. These and two later engines of very similar design built by Neilson and Company handled the entire traffic for eighty years until the opening of the five mile long base tunnel in 1955. Widmark was an inventive engineer and patented a design of steam operated cylinder cocks which were of great use to Avonside on articulated locomotives since they dispensed with mechanical linkages.

4-6-0 types
Avonside was a very early British builder of the  type of tender locomotive. Ten narrow gauge freight-hauling  locomotives, weighing from 20 to 25 tons, were supplied to the Toronto, Grey and Bruce Railway and the Toronto and Nipissing Railway. These very successful and reliable wood-burning locomotives pre-dated the first significant British domestic railway , the 'Jones Goods', by over 20 years.

Saddle tanks
Between 1880 and 1930 Avonside are best remembered for the construction of s and s for industrial and dock shunting purposes.

Internal Combustion
Avonside produced their first "Oil Motor" locomotive in 1913. Diesel and petrol powered locomotives were included in their range right up to the end in 1935.

Preservation

Globally there are 63 Avonside locomotives preserved.

United Kingdom
The Industrial Railway Society record 34 Avonside locomotives extant in the United Kingdom as at 2008-11-01.

Avonside Engine Company locomotives preserved in the UK include:

Coke-fired for cleanliness, it worked on the Bournville Works Railway its entire life. Donated by Cadbury plc to the Birmingham Railway Museum in Tyseley in 1976, it is presently stored awaiting restoration on the Gloucestershire Warwickshire Railway at Toddington.
 IW&D 34 "Portbury"  works number 1964 at Bristol Harbour Railway
 "Stamford"  works number 1972 at the Rutland Railway Museum
 GWR No. 1340 "Trojan"  works number 1386 at the Didcot Railway Centre
 "Woolmer" , ex-Longmoor Military Railway, preserved at Milestones Museum, Basingstoke
 Barrington an  locomotive at Colne Valley Railway
No. 1798   "Edwin Hulse", preserved and undergoing overhaul at the Avon Valley railway

Ireland 
  gauge  "Nancy" in working order at the Cavan and Leitrim Railway.
 Londonderry Port and Harbour Commissioners No.3 "R H Smyth"  works number 2021 at the Railway Preservation Society of Ireland Whitehead

New Zealand
Avonside Engine Company locomotives preserved in New Zealand include:

 R 28 – 1217 of 1878 (single Fairlie) Reefton
 H 199 – 1075 of 1875 (Fell type) Fell Locomotive Museum, Featherston
 L 207/507 – 1205 of 1877 Museum of Transport and Technology, Auckland
 L 208/508 – 1206 of 1877 Shantytown, Greymouth
 L 219/509 – 1207 of 1877 Silver Stream Railway, Wellington

Brazil
Avonside Engine Company locomotives preserved in Brazil include:

 Avonside #1047 from 1873, metre gauge (3' 3 3/8"),  Usina Amália #3. Operated originally at EFY, then at USY, SRy and EFS, from where it was sold to Usina Amália in Santa Rosa de Viterbo, SP. Today she's operational at LP Assessoria Industrial in Votorantim, SP.
 Avonside #1244 from 1879, metre gauge (3' 3 3/8"),  EFS #23. Operated originally at EFY, then at USY, SRy and EFS, from where it was sold to Usina Santa Lina in Quatá, SP. Today she's operational at Paraguaçu Paulista, SP, railway museum.

Belgium 

 Avonside Engine co.ltd #1908 "Fred" from 1925. Operated originally at Buxton Lime works with #RS16. Today's she's operational at Stoomcentrum Maldegem.

See also
Avonside Locomotive Works

References

Sources
 Industrial Locomotive Society, (1967) Steam locomotives in industry, David and Charles
 Lowe, J.W., (1989) British Steam Locomotive Builders, Guild Publishing
 L.T.C. Rolt, A Hunslet Hundred, David & Charles, 1964, (Avonside Engine Company – pages 102–116).
 
 "The Fairlie Locomotive"; Rowland A S Abbott; pub. David & Charles, Newton Abbot, 1970.
 "Narrow Gauge Through the Bush – Ontario's Toronto Grey & Bruce and Toronto and Nipissing Railways"; Rod Clarke; pub. Beaumont and Clarke with the Credit Valley Railway Company, Streetsville, Ontario, 2007.
 

Locomotive manufacturers of the United Kingdom
 
Defunct companies based in Bristol
Manufacturing companies based in Bristol